Who Me was a chemical weapon developed by the American Office of Strategic Services.

Who Me may also refer to:

 "Who Me", a song by DJ Vadim from the album U.S.S.R. The Art of Listening, 2002
 "Who Me", a song by Megan Thee Stallion and Pooh Shiesty from the album Traumazine, 2022
 "Who Me?", a 1991 song by KMD

See also
 Why Me (disambiguation)